Brendan Clarke-Smith (born 17 August 1980) is a British Conservative Party politician and former teacher serving as Parliamentary Secretary for the Cabinet Office between September and October 2022. He served as Parliamentary Under-Secretary of State for Children and Families from July to September 2022. He was elected as the Member of Parliament (MP) for Bassetlaw in the 2019 general election.

Early life and career
Clarke-Smith was born in Clifton, Nottingham in 1980. He grew up on a council estate in Nottingham and was the first member of his family to go to university, studying politics at Nottingham Trent University and later gaining a PGCE in religious education. He became a teacher at an International School in Romania.

Political career
Clarke-Smith first stood as a Conservative Party candidate in 2003 when he was elected as a councillor for the Clifton North ward of Nottingham City Council. He was re-elected to this position in 2007 and subsequently contested the neighbouring Clifton South Ward in 2011 but failed to be elected by a margin of 676 votes. He stood as one of the Conservative Party candidates for the EU elections in 2014 and 2019 in the East Midlands region but was not elected. Clarke-Smith campaigned to leave the EU in the 2016 EU referendum and was a member of the Vote Leave campaign, which secured a 67.8% leave vote. In May 2019, Clarke-Smith overturned a Labour majority in Boughton and Walesby to be elected as a councillor on Newark & Sherwood District Council.
 
He was selected as the Conservative party candidate for Bassetlaw in the December 2019 elections when the sitting MP John Mann stood down. He overturned a Labour majority with the biggest swing in the election, from a 4,852 Labour majority to a 14,013 Conservative majority. This is the first time Bassetlaw has been represented by a party other than Labour since Malcolm MacDonald won the seat in 1929. When elected, Clarke-Smith said his three main priorities were getting Brexit done, improving Bassetlaw Hospital and attracting more money for Retford and Worksop town centres.

In December 2019, Clarke-Smith was reported to be one of the new members of the eurosceptic European Research Group.

Clarke-Smith has received media attention for his views on food banks and public provision of free school meals for children from more economically deprived families. He has described food banks as a "political weapon", saying it is "simply not true" that "people can't afford to buy food on a regular basis" and "If you keep saying to people that you're going to give stuff away, then you're going to have an increase I'm afraid." In October 2020, he opposed a Labour Party Opposition Day Motion to extend free school meals over holidays until Easter 2021. Campaigning on the issue of free school meals was led by the footballer Marcus Rashford. Clarke-Smith said: "We need to get back to the idea of taking responsibility. This means less celebrity virtue signalling on Twitter by proxy and more action to tackle the real causes of child poverty."

In March 2020, Clarke-Smith was appointed to the International Development Committee in Parliament.

Following an interim report on the connections between colonialism and properties now in the care of the National Trust, including links with historic slavery, Clarke-Smith was among the signatories of a letter to The Telegraph in November 2020 from the "Common Sense Group" of Conservative Parliamentarians. The letter accused the National Trust of being "coloured by Cultural Marxist dogma, colloquially known as the 'woke agenda'".

He has expressed concern over plans to close the mental health facilities at Bassetlaw Hospital and move provision to Mansfield, campaigned for the Robin Hood train line to be extended to Retford and was a signatory to the successful East Midlands bid to be one of ten Freeports.

In June 2021, Clarke-Smith opposed the England football team's intention to take the knee at the forthcoming European championship, saying: "Fans understand [racism] perfectly well – they are just sick and tired of being preached and spoken down to. They are there to watch a football match, not to be lectured on morality."

In November 2021, he became an advocate of the Down Syndrome Bill, which would recognise people with Down syndrome as a specific minority group.

On May 24, 2022, Brendan Clarke-Smith explicitly admitted he would happily back a lawbreaker as Prime Minister during a Channel 4 interview. When asked by Channel 4 News presenter Cathy Newman if he was "content to back a law-breaker in office", he replied "I certainly am. And I think the Prime Minister's done many achievements so far. I think he's still got a long time in office as well." Clarke-Smith later took issue with being quoted on the matter, asking Cathy Newman on Twitter "Not sure why your sub-editor is using quotation marks here".

On 6 June 2022, after a vote of no confidence in the leadership of Boris Johnson was called, Clarke-Smith announced that he would be supporting the Prime Minister, describing the vote as "one of the most ridiculous acts of self-harm I have witnessed in a long time". The following day, Clarke-Smith was criticised following an appearance on Jeremy Vine, during which he accused people of "using personal tragedies" during the COVID-19 pandemic for "party political agendas".

Brendan Clarke-Smith briefly served as a Parliamentary Under Secretary of State (Minister for Children and Families) at the Department for Education between the 8th July and 7th September 2022.

In February 2023, Brendan Clarke-Smith visited Northern Cyprus  and controversially met with the Turkish Republic of Northern Cyprus (TRNC) Government. The TRNC is not internationally recognised as a legitimate Government, and their annexation of Northern Cyprus is considered illegal by the UN, under international law. Brendan Clarke-Smith was admonished by the UK Foreign, Commonwealth and Development Office for his actions, as the recognition of the TRNC Government was taken without UK Government authority.

Personal life
Clarke-Smith lives in the Market town of Retford – in the Bassetlaw parliamentary constituency, with his Romanian wife, who is a doctor at Bassetlaw Hospital. They have a son.

References

External links

1980 births
Living people
UK MPs 2019–present
Conservative Party (UK) MPs for English constituencies
Alumni of Nottingham Trent University
Politicians from Nottingham
People from Clifton, Nottinghamshire
British Eurosceptics
Ministers for children, young people and families